Gar Francis is an American singer-songwriter.

Biography 

Gar Francis grew up in North Plainfield, New Jersey in the early sixties.  Francis started playing the guitar at an early age, By the 1970s, he formed a New Jersey base band called The Rockids, who were regulars at CBGB's and Max's Kanasas City in Manahattan, NY.  In the 1980s Francis wrote a song called "Baby, It's You" for the band Ricochet.   Francis also did session work as a guitar player on Billy Idol's recorded version of "Mony, Mony".  Francis joined Sticky Fingers, a Rolling Stones Tribute band. 

In 2005, Francis began writing and playing guitar for the 60s garage rock band The Doughboys (New Jersey) on their album called "Is It Now?" Francis produced the hit single "Black Sheep", which was voted No. 2 "Coolest Song In The World for 2008" on Little Steven's Underground Garage. Francis officially became a member of The Doughboys at about this time. Gar continue to write and produce his own original songs. His single called "Rocket" was written as a tribute for those serving in the U.S. Armed Forces. It because a hit when he perform it in front of men and women at Ft. Dix, NJ.

The Doughboys' second CD Act Your Rage produced another hit single called "I’m Not Your Man", which Little Steven's Underground Garage picked for "Coolest Song In The World" the week of September 5, 2009. It was voted by the station's listeners as "#3 Coolest Song In The World" for 2009. 

In 2012, Francis participated in the creation of two songs which appeared in the indie film Fairhaven which premiered at the 2012 Tribeca Film Festival. The songs were "Turn Your Love On Me" by The Doughboys (New Jersey) and "The Bank Of The River" from Francis' Americana album The More Things Change, The More They Stay Same.

As of 2013, Francis continued to write songs for independent artists under the Bongo Boy Records label including The Easy Outs, Jana Peri, Jean Lozier Genya Ravan, Kelly Caruso, a Mississippi Delta juke joint band The Groundhawgs, as well as a bluesman by the name of Plainfield Slim. and Mark Lindsay

In 2014, Francis joined the group The Satisfactors, who released an album The Satisfactors on Bongo Boys Records.

Discography

Full albums

 Queen Of Your Dreams – Jeanne Lozier with Gar Francis- 2005
 Another Mule in the Barn – Plainfield Slim- 2006
 Is It Now? – The Doughboys – 2008
 When The Devil Hits Home – Plainfield Slim & The Groundhagws – 2009
 Act Your Rage – The Doughboys – 2009
 Rock N' Raw – The Doughboys live with Gar Francis – 2011
 Love & Protest – Gar Francis – 2011
 Bootleg Volume One – Gar Francis −2011
 The More Things Change The More They Stay The Same – Gar Francis – 2011
 Shine On ( EP ) Gar Francis 2012
 Take It Or Leave It – A Tribute to the Queen Of Noise – The Easy Outs with Gar Francis 2011
 Under The Influence of Christmas – Santa Make Me Good – The Grip Weeds with Gar Francis

Compilation albums

 Red Hot Blues – United Blues Network 2004
 Urban Legends of NJ – United Jersey Blues Network 2006
 the ARS Sessions – Plainfield Slim & The Groundhawgs
 Little Steven Underground Garage Vol. 7 – The Doughboys with Gar Francis 2008
 American Roots Live Presents – The Studio Masters 2009

Singles

 Baby It Is You – Ricochet 1981
 Dance – Ricochet 1981
 Mony Mony – Billy Idol with Gar Francis July 1982
 Black Sheep – The Doughboys – 2008
 I'm Not A Man – The Doughboys – 2009
 Rocket – Gar Francis – 2009
 Ballerina of the Bowery – Jana Peri – 2010
 Come On, Come On – The Easy Outs – 2010
 I Won't Cry Anymore – Genya Ravan – 2011
 Lady Gaga – The Swinging Iggies – 2011
 Let's Have A Rockin Christmas – Jackie Kringle & The Elves – 2011
 Born Dainty – Kelly Caruso – 2012

References

External links
Gar Francis.com
Bongo Boy Records

Year of birth missing (living people)
Living people
American male singer-songwriters
American singer-songwriters